Renea moutonii s a species of land snail with an operculum, a terrestrial gastropod mollusk in the family Aciculidae.

Subspecies
 Renea moutonii moutonii (Dupuy, 1849)
 Renea moutonii singularis (Pollonera, 1905)

Distribution
This species is endemic to France and occurs in the Alpes-Maritimes,

References

 Bank, R. A.; Neubert, E. (2017). Checklist of the land and freshwater Gastropoda of Europe. Last update: July 16, 2017

External links

 Boeters, H. D.; Gittenberger, E. & Subai, P. (1989). Die Aciculidae (Mollusca: Gastropoda Prosobranchia). Zoologische Verhandelingen. 252: 1-234. Leiden

Renea (gastropod)
Gastropods described in 1849
Endemic molluscs of Metropolitan France
Taxonomy articles created by Polbot